Eltjo Marinus Jan Schutter (born 17 June 1953) is a retired Dutch decathlete. He competed at the 1976 Summer Olympics, but failed in the 400 metres.

Schutter virtually retired from competitions in 1979 to study gynecology and obstetrics and graduated in 1984, becoming one of the youngest gynecologists in the Netherlands. From 1984 to 1990 he lived in Mönchengladbach in connection with his medical work. After returning to the Netherlands he was employed at the VU University Medical Center and then at the Medisch Spectrum Twente. He also occasionally worked as a radio commentator of athletics events.

References

1953 births
Living people
Athletes (track and field) at the 1976 Summer Olympics
Dutch decathletes
Dutch male long jumpers
Dutch male pole vaulters
Olympic athletes of the Netherlands
Dutch gynaecologists
People from Velsen
20th-century Dutch physicians
21st-century Dutch physicians
Sportspeople from North Holland